The Indianapolis Chiefs were a minor league professional ice hockey team that played in the International Hockey League from 1955 to 1962. The Chiefs were based in Indianapolis, Indiana and played at the Indiana State Fair Coliseum. In seven seasons, the Chiefs never had a regular season record with more wins than losses, but were finalists for the 1957 Turner Cup in a season dominated by the Cincinnati Mohawks. The Chiefs won the 1958 Turner Cup by defeating the Louisville Rebels in seven games.

Season-by-season results

External links
 standings and results

International Hockey League (1945–2001) teams
Defunct ice hockey teams in the United States
Ice hockey clubs established in 1955
Ice hockey teams in Indiana
Sports clubs disestablished in 1962
1955 establishments in Indiana
1962 disestablishments in Indiana
Defunct sports teams in Indiana
Sports teams in Indianapolis